Humankind is all humans collectively.

Humankind may also refer to:
 Humankind (video game), a 2021 strategy game by Amplitude Studios
 Humankind, an American radio show on WGBH (FM)
 "Humankind", a 2021 song on Music of the Spheres (Coldplay album)See alsoHumankind: A Hopeful History, a 2019 Dutch book by Rutger Bregman
 Ancestors: The Humankind Odyssey, a 2019 survival video game
Cradle of Humankind, a paleoanthropological site in South Africa
 Origins: The Journey of Humankind, a 2017 American documentary TV series
 Sapiens: A Brief History of Humankind, a 2014 Hebrew book by Yuval Noah Harari
Temples of Humankind, a series of underground temples in northern Italy
 "The Cradle of Humankind", a song on Flogging Molly's 2011 album, Speed of Darkness''